Sigurd Hoel (December 14, 1890 – October 14, 1960) was a Norwegian author and publishing consultant, born in Nord-Odal. He debuted with the collection of short stories  (The Way We Go) in 1922.

Life
Hoel was born in Nord-Odal, Norway, in 1890. He was the son of teacher Lars Anton and Elisa Dorothea Hoel and grew up in Odalen. He was admitted into Ragna Nielsen's school in Kristiania (now Oslo), but when he finished school in 1909, he could not afford to begin college right away. He worked for a while as an insurance salesman before he could begin his studies in 1910, during which time he supported himself with teaching jobs.

In his time at college he was the editor of the periodical Minerva. His literary career began with the short story "" ('The Idiot') from 1918, when he won a writing contest. In 1920 he wrote the comedy  together with his friend Finn Bø. Harald Grieg got him a job as a consultant for Gyldendal Norsk Forlag and Erling Falk made him the editor of Mot Dag.

In 1924 he traveled to Berlin to study socialism, and there he wrote his first novel,  ('The Seven Star'). He continued on to Paris, where he met Nic Waal (died 1960), whom he married in Norway in 1927. They separated in 1936, and the same year he married again, this time to Ada Ivan. From 1934 to 1939 Hoel was a colleague of Wilhelm Reich who then had chosen Oslo as his exile. Since January 1934 he had received training analysis from Reich but the extent of his own practice as a therapist was limited to four patients.  Hoel contributed to Reich's German language periodical  (Journal for Political Psychology and Sex Economy) and was the editor-in-chief of issues nos. 13 to 15. One of his major essays deals with the Moscow Trials.

During the war Hoel and his wife went back to Odalen. He participated in the Resistance, and wrote articles for the Resistance press. In 1943 he was forced to flee to Sweden.

Hoel had a short connection to the landsmål movement, but later played an active part in the riksmål campaign. He died of a heart attack at age 69 in Oslo.

Body of work
 (Road to the World's End, 1933) is a child's portrayal from a farm environment and is considered one of his key works, together with, among other things, the novel  (Meeting at the Milestone, 1947). In this novel he both distances himself from Nazism and portrays the confrontation of war as a problem. The last novel, Trollringen (The Troll Circle, 1958), is also among his best-known works.

As the main consultant for Norwegian and translated literature for Gyldendal publishing, Hoel made an impression on a whole generation of Norwegian literature. From 1929 to 1959 Hoel was the editor of the publisher's "Gold Series", where he introduced a number of foreign authors, often with an astounding foresight for which works would remain. The series comprised 101 books—including works from authors such as Ernest Hemingway, F. Scott Fitzgerald and Franz Kafka. Hoel wrote prefaces for all of the books, and the preferences are collected in the books 50 gold (1939) and The last 51 gold (1959).

Works

 Knut Hamsun, O. Norlis, 1920
 Veien vi gaar, Gyldendal, 1922. Short stories.
 Syvstjernen, Gyldendal, 1924. Novel.
 Syndere i sommersol, Gyldendal, 1927. Novel.
 Ingenting, Gyldendal, 1929. Novel.
 Mot muren, Gyldendal, 1930. Drama.
 Don Juan, Gyldendal, 1930. Drama, written together with Helge Krog.
 En dag i oktober, Gyldendal, 1931. Novel.
 Veien til verdens ende, Gyldendal, 1933. Novel.
 Fjorten dager før frostnettene, Gyldendal, 1935. Novel.
 Sesam sesam, Gyldendal, 1938. Novel.
 Prinsessen på glassberget, Gyldendal, 1939. Short stories.
 50 gule, Gyldendal, 1939. Articles.
 Arvestålet, Gyldendal, 1941. Novel.
 Tanker i mærketid, Gyldendal, 1945. Essays.
 Møte ved milepelen, Gyldendal, 1947. Novel.
 Tanker fra mange tider, Gyldendal, 1948. Essays.
 Jeg er blitt glad i en annen, Gyldendal, 1951. Novel.
 Tanker mellom barken og veden, Gyldendal, 1952. Essays.
 Stevnemøte med glemte år, Gyldendal, 1954. Novel.
 Tanker om norsk diktning, Gyldendal, 1955. Essays.
 Ved foten av Babels tårn, Gyldendal, 1956. Novel.
 Trollringen, Gyldendal, 1956. Novel.
 De siste 51 gule, Gyldendal, 1959. Articles.

Posthumous works 
 Ettertanker, Gyldendal, 1980. Left behind essays and articles, published by Leif Longum.
 Litterære essays, Dreyer, 1990. Published by Helge Nordahl.

Translations 
 Anita Loos, Gentlemen Prefer Blondes, Gyldendal, 1926.
 Joseph Conrad, The Nigger of the Narcissus, Gyldendal, 1928
 Joseph Conrad, Heart of Darkness, Gyldendal, 1929
 Joseph Conrad, Lord Jim, Gyldendal, 1932
 William Faulkner, Light in August, Gyldendal, 1934
 Arthur Koestler, Arrival and Departure, Gyldendal, 1946

Awards and distinctions 
Gyldendal's Endowment (Gyldendal's Legacy) 1940
Bokhandlerprisen (Bookseller Award) 1948

References

External links
 

1890 births
1960 deaths
People from Nord-Odal
Norwegian writers
Mot Dag
Members of the Norwegian Academy